The 2019 IIHF Women's World Championship Final was played on 14 April 2019, at Espoo Metro Areena in Espoo, Finland. The United States defeated Finland 2–1 in a shootout, to win its fifth consecutive and ninth overall title.

Background 

Since the first IIHF Women's World Championship in 1990 and the first women's tournament at the Winter Olympics in 1998, the American and Canadian national teams have played in the finals on all occasions except for the 2006 Winter Olympics, where Sweden played Canada after eliminating the United States in the semi-final.

Finland stunned Canada in the semi-finals, beating them by a score of 4–2, their first-ever semifinal victory and advanced to the gold medal game for the first time in IIHF Women's World Championship history.

Disallowed goal controversy
During the final between the United States and Finland, it appeared Finland had won 2–1 after Petra Nieminen scored what appeared to be the game-winning goal in overtime. Not only would it have been Finland's first Women's World Championship, but it would've been the first time any nation had beaten both the USA and Canada in the same women's hockey tournament. However, since Finnish defender Jenni Hiirikoski made contact with American goaltender Alex Rigsby just outside of the crease, the Video Goal Judge initiated a video review while the Finnish players were celebrating on the ice. The goal was reviewed for over ten minutes and eventually overturned. The IIHF released a press statement the next day citing rules 186 and 183ii as the reasons for overturning the goal:-According to IIHF Playing Rule 186 v. Goaltender and Goal/Goal Crease Disallowed: An attacking skater who makes contact other than incidental with a goaltender who is out of his goal crease during game action will be assessed a minor penalty for interference. If a goal is scored at this time, it will not count.
 
-According to IIHF Playing Rule 183 ii. Protection of a Goaltender: Incidental contact is allowed when the goaltender is in the act of playing the puck outside his goal crease, provided the attacking skater makes a reasonable effort to minimize or avoid such contact. 

Despite the goal being disallowed, Rigsby was issued a two-minute penalty for tripping and Hiirikoski was not issued any penalties. Neither team was able to score in the remaining minutes of overtime, with the Americans successfully killing off two power-plays. The United States went on to defeat Finland 2–1 in the shootout.

Finnish goaltender Noora Räty finished with 51 saves on 52 shots and Rigbsy with 26 saves on 27 shots.

Reactions  
Following an initial period of uncertainty as the goal was being reviewed, the final decision to overturn the goal sparked a number of strong reactions from players, staff, and fans. Finnish NHLer Kasperi Kapanen spoke out against the decision, stating that "I think they kind of messed it up," with retired Canadian Olympian Hayley Wickenheiser agreeing, stating "That. Was. A. Goal."

Rigsby defended the decision, stating that she had immediately known the goal was illegal, and that "I was the one who got body-slammed. But the ref thinks I tried tripping the player when I was on the ground, and somehow I end up with the penalty. Funny how that went." She, however, still praised Finland, stating that "This is the best Finnish team we’ve ever seen."

Aftermath   
After the game, the Finnish ice hockey association announced that it would be giving the players the €7000 bonus for winning gold instead of the €5000 bonus for winning silver. Unlike the men's World Championships, however, there was no IIHF bonus for the players for winning either medal.

Finnish broadcaster Yle released viewership numbers of over 2,3 million people watching the finals on TV in Finland - more than half the country's population. The 2019 Finnish parliamentary election was held on the same day as the finals

After the finals, Finnish legend Riikka Sallinen, considered among the greatest hockey players of all-time, announced her permanent retirement from the game. Finnish veterans Linda Välimäki and Venla Hovi also announced their retirements after the tournament.

Road to the final

Match

References

External links
Official website

IIHF Women's World Championship
Final
IIHF Women's World Championship
Finland women's national ice hockey team
IIHF Women's World Championship Final
IIHF Women's World Championship Final
United States women's national ice hockey team
History of ice hockey